is a Japanese light novel written by Mei Hachimoku and illustrated by Kukka, published by Shogakukan under its Gagaga Bunko imprint in July 2019. A manga adaptation, titled The Tunnel to Summer, the Exit of Goodbyes: Ultramarine and illustrated by Koudon, was serialized in Shogakukan's seinen manga magazine Monthly Sunday Gene-X from July 2020 to November 2021, with its chapters collected in four tankōbon volumes. Both the light novel and manga are licensed in North America by Seven Seas Entertainment. An anime film adaptation by  premiered in September 2022.

Characters

Media

Light novel
The Tunnel to Summer, the Exit of Goodbyes, written by Mei Hachimoku and illustrated by Kukka, was released by Shogakukan under its Gagaga Bunko imprint on July 18, 2019. 

In July 2021, Seven Seas Entertainment announced that they had licensed the light novel for English release in North America. It was released on May 17, 2022.

Manga
A manga adaptation, illustrated by Koudon, started its serialization in Shogakukan's seinen manga magazine Monthly Sunday Gene-X on July 18, 2020. The series was also published on the MangaONE app. The first of the final chapter was published on MangaONE on October 1, 2021, and the series finished in Monthly Sunday Gene-X on November 19 of the same year. Shogakukan collected its chapters in four tankōbon volumes, released from December 18, 2020, to December 17, 2021

In July 2021, Seven Seas Entertainment announced that they had licensed the manga for English release in North America. The first volume was released on July 26, 2022.

Volume list

Anime film
An anime film adaptation was announced on December 15, 2021. It premiered in Japan on September 9, 2022.

Sentai Filmworks licensed the film outside of Asia.

References

External links
  
 

2019 Japanese novels
Anime and manga based on light novels
Drama anime and manga
Gagaga Bunko
Japanese romance novels
Japanese science fiction novels
Light novels
Romance anime and manga
Science fiction anime and manga
Seinen manga
Sentai Filmworks
Seven Seas Entertainment titles
Shogakukan manga